Caucaea is a genus of flowering plants from the orchid family, Orchidaceae. It contains 9 currently recognized species, all native to northwestern South America.

Caucaea alticola (Stacy) N.H.Williams & M.W.Chase - Ecuador
Caucaea andigena (Linden & Rchb.f.) N.H.Williams & M.W.Chase  - Ecuador
Caucaea macrotyle (Königer & J.Portilla) Königer - Ecuador
Caucaea nubigena (Lindl.) N.H.Williams & M.W.Chase - Ecuador, Colombia, Venezuela, Peru
Caucaea olivacea (Kunth) N.H.Williams & M.W.Chase - Ecuador, Colombia
Caucaea phalaenopsis (Linden & Rchb.f.) N.H.Williams & M.W.Chase - Ecuador, Colombia
Caucaea radiata (Lindl.) Mansf. - Ecuador, Colombia, Venezuela
Caucaea sanguinolenta (Lindl.) N.H.Williams & M.W.Chase - Ecuador, Colombia, Venezuela
Caucaea tripterygia (Rchb.f.) N.H.Williams & M.W.Chase - Ecuador, Peru

See also 
List of Orchidaceae genera

References 

  (2009). Epidendroideae (Part two). Genera Orchidacearum 5: 235 ff. Oxford University Press.
  2005. Handbuch der Orchideen-Namen. Dictionary of Orchid Names. Dizionario dei nomi delle orchidee. Ulmer, Stuttgart

External links 
 
 

Oncidiinae genera
Oncidiinae